Charles William Taylor (born 12 August 1966) is a former English cricketer. Taylor was a left-handed batsman who bowled left-arm medium-fast. He was born at Banbury, Oxfordshire.

Taylor first appeared in county cricket for Oxfordshire, making a single appearance for his home county in the 1986 Minor Counties Championship against Devon. Taylor later made his first-class debut for Middlesex against Nottinghamshire in the 1990 County Championship. He made 32 further first-class appearances for the county, the last of which came against Oxford University in 1995. A bowler capable of brisk pace, in his 33 first-class appearances for Middlesex, he took a total of 72 wickets at an average of 33.62, with best figures of 5/33. These figures were his only first-class five wicket haul and came against Yorkshire in his second first-class appearance in 1990. His most successful season with the ball came in 1992, when he featured in eighteen first-class matches, taking 35 wickets at an average of 40.71. With the bat, he scored a total of 175 runs during his career, which came at a batting average of 10.93, with a high score of 28 not out.

Taylor also played List A cricket for Middlesex, with his debut in that format coming against Gloucestershire in the 1991 Refuge Assurance League. He made eleven further List A appearances for the county, the last of which came against Yorkshire in the 1994 AXA Equity & Law League. In his twelve List A appearances, he took a total of 8 wickets at an average of 43.87, with best figures of 2/33. His career ended in a freak accident in which he injured his back, while changing the tyre on his car after suffering a puncture when the security poles inside the Grace Gates at Lord's activated while he was driving over them.

References

External links
Charles Taylor at ESPNcricinfo
Charles Taylor at CricketArchive

1966 births
Living people
Sportspeople from Banbury
English cricketers
Oxfordshire cricketers
Middlesex cricketers